Hekla (1,491 m), Iceland, volcano
 Öræfajökull (2,110 m), Iceland, volcano - highest mountain in Iceland
 Snæfellsjökull (1,448 m), Iceland, volcano
 Esjan (914 m), Iceland, -about 10 km north of Reykjavík

 
Iceland
Mountains
Iceland